Dunedin is an electorate to the New Zealand House of Representatives.

History
In the 2019–20 electoral boundary review, all five electorates in the Otago and Southland regions had to be adjusted as they exceeded the 5% population quota. Some electorates were over and some were under the quota, but taken together they were almost exactly on quota. Both  and Dunedin South were significantly below quota and had to gain population. Otago Peninsula was moved from Dunedin South to Dunedin North; this area has a population of about 8,000 people. A large area from the northern part of the Dunedin North electorate (including Palmerston, Macraes, and Herbert) went to the  electorate, a loss of 2,500 people. Adding the southern Dunedin area of Otago Peninsula made it necessary for both Dunedin North and Dunedin South to be recreated under new names, with the former Dunedin North plus Otago Peninsula now called the Dunedin electorate. The former Dunedin South electorate extended into the south Otago area and the  electorate was recreated.

Members of Parliament

List MPs
Members of Parliament elected from party lists in elections where that person also unsuccessfully contested the Dunedin electorate. Unless otherwise stated, all MPs terms began and ended at general elections.

Election results

2020 election

References

2020 establishments in New Zealand
New Zealand electorates
Constituencies established in 2020